This is a list of supermarket chains in North America.

Canada

Greenland
Brugseni (7 stores) 
Pisiffik (11 supermarket stores) 
Spar (11 supermarket stores) 
Pilersuisoq (64 stores)

Honduras
 PriceSmart (Wholesale Club)
 Walmart

Mexico

United States and territories

References

North America
Supermarkets